Lviv Cycling Team is a Ukrainian UCI Continental cycling team established in 2017. It gained UCI Continental status in 2018.

Team roster

Major wins
Sources:
2018
 Stage 1 Tour of Mediterrennean, Tymur Malieiev
2019
  National Road race, Elchin Asadov
  National Time trial, Elchin Asadov

National, continental, world and Olympic champions
2019
  Azerbaijani Road race, Elchin Asadov
  Azerbaijani Time trial, Elchin Asadov

References

UCI Continental Teams (Europe)
Cycling teams based in Ukraine
Cycling teams established in 2017
2017 establishments in Ukraine
Sport in Lviv